Andorra competed at the 2018 Winter Olympics in Pyeongchang, South Korea, from 9 to 25 February 2018, with five competitors in three sports.

Competitors
The following is the list of number of competitors participating in the Andorran delegation per sport.

Alpine skiing 

Andorra qualified three alpine skiers.

Cross-country skiing 

Andorra qualified one male and one female cross-country skier, but chose to only send their male representative.

Distance

Snowboarding

Andorra qualified one male athlete in snowboard cross.

Snowboard cross

See also
Andorra at the 2018 Summer Youth Olympics

References

Nations at the 2018 Winter Olympics
2018
2018 in Andorran sport